Rothwell Ward, representing the town of Rothwell and formed from the merger of Trinity and Tresham, was created by boundary changes in 2007.

The ward was last fought at Borough Council level in the 2007 local council elections, in which all three seats were won by the Conservatives.

The current councillors are Cllr. Cedwien Brown, Cllr. Karl Sumpter & Cllr. Margaret Talbot.

Councillors
Kettering Borough Council Elections 2007
Cedwien Brown (Conservative)
Alan Pote (Conservative)
Margaret Talbot (Conservative)

Current Ward Boundaries (2007-)

Kettering Borough Council Elections 2007
Note: due to boundary changes, vote changes listed below are based on notional results.

See also
Kettering
Kettering Borough Council

Electoral wards in Kettering